Brookula corula is a species of minute sea snail, a marine gastropod mollusc, unassigned in the superfamily Seguenzioidea.

Distribution
This species is found off North and South Islands, New Zealand

References

 Iredale, T. (1912). New generic names and new species of marine Mollusca. Proceedings of the Malacological Society of London. 10(3): 217-228, pl. 9. 
 Powell A. W. B., New Zealand Mollusca, William Collins Publishers Ltd, Auckland, New Zealand 1979 

corulum
Gastropods of New Zealand
Gastropods described in 1885